Film Adventurer Karel Zeman is a 2015 Czech documentary film about Karel Zeman. It focuses on Zeman's life and work, documenting the creation of his films. The film also features reconstruction of famous scenes of Zeman's films made by animation students.Terry Gilliam and Tim Burton are featured in the film.

References

External links
Official site

2015 films
Czech documentary films
Karel Zeman
2015 documentary films